Jean-Luc Fichet (born 15 July 1953 in Saint-Brieuc-de-Mauron) is a French politician and a former member of the Senate of France. He represented the Finistère department and is a member of the Socialist Party.

References
Page on the Senate website 

1953 births
Living people
French Senators of the Fifth Republic
Socialist Party (France) politicians
Senators of Finistère
People from Morbihan